"Fussball ist immer noch wichtig" (Football is still important) is a song by Fettes Brot, Bela B. of Die Ärzte, Marcus Wiebusch of Kettcar and Carsten Friedrichs of Superpunk. It was written for the 2006 FIFA World Cup and is about reviving the belief in football.

There is also an instrumental version of the song, only available as a digital download.

Video
The video shows artists recording the song in studio.

Track listing
 Fussball ist immer noch wichtig
 Fussball ist immer noch wichtig (Video)

External links

2006 singles
Bela B. songs
Songs written by Bela B.
2006 songs